Gibbula corallioides is a species of sea snail, a marine gastropod mollusk in the family Trochidae, the top snails.

Description
It is similar to Gibbula magus and has often been considered in the past a synonym of this species. But it is somewhat smaller and the color variations are different.

Distribution
This species occurs in the Atlantic Ocean off the Cape Verde Archipelago.

References

corallioides
Gastropods described in 1898
Gastropods of Cape Verde